Masku Areena is an indoor arena in  Lempäälä, Finland.  The arena was built in 1995 and has a capacity of 900. It is the home arena for LeKi of the Mestis hockey league, the second top league in Finland behind Liiga. The arena is a part of the Hakkari Sports Centre, which also hosts tennis courts, ice skating rinks and more.

The record attendance for a game was in 2011, where a game featuring the Ilves vs Ässät drew a crowd of 810.

The arena was previously known as the Xerox arena until it was renamed in 2007.

References

Indoor arenas in Finland
Indoor ice hockey venues in Finland
Lempäälä